Molly Suzanne Blake ( McClenaghan; 14 August 1917 – 9 June 2011) was a British illustrator, BBC children's television presenter and children's author.

Career 

Blake studied at the Central School of Art and Design in London.

Her parents were the actress, dancer and broadcaster Annette Mills, best remembered for being the partner of the puppet "Muffin", in the successful BBC Television children's series Muffin the Mule between 1946 and 1955, and her first husband, Henry McClenaghan. Molly produced many of the illustrations in the popular series of children's books of Muffin the Mule stories. One of her drawings of Muffin was used in Radio Times in 1951.

Mills also appeared on television with the glove puppet "Prudence Kitten". After Mills' death in January 1955, Blake took over the role. Her earliest such appearance was on 27 July 1955. She also wrote Prudence Kitten books, but these were illustrated by others.

A 1947 portrait photograph of Blake, by John Gay, is in the collection of the National Portrait Gallery. She was photographed by Gay for, and featured in, an article in The Strand Magazine, "Eight Young Artists in Search of an Editor", in which she was said to be married, and living in Marylebone. Her husband was David H. Blake.

She died in 2011, aged 93.

Family 

Her uncle, her mother's younger brother, was the actor John Mills, meaning she was a cousin to his daughters, Juliet Mills and Hayley Mills. Blake illustrated Far Morning by Mary Hayley Bell, John Mills' second wife.

Blake's daughter is the actor Susie Blake.

Publications

Books by Blake

Books illustrated by Blake

Contributions to other books 

 My Annette Mills Gift Book. Stories written by Annette Mills. Published by London: The Heirloom Library. [n.d. c. 1955]. Molly Blake illustrates the 5 Muffin the Mule stories in this collection.

References 

1917 births
2011 deaths
20th-century British artists
British illustrators
British children's television presenters
BBC people
British children's writers
British children's book illustrators
Alumni of the Central School of Art and Design